"The Song of the Walloons" is the regional anthem of Wallonia in Belgium. The original lyrics were written by Théophile Bovy in 1900 in the Walloon language. A year later, it was set to music composed by Louis Hillier. Performed for the first time in the city of Liège, the song quickly spread to other parts of French-speaking Belgium and established itself like a "national" anthem for Wallonia. 

It was approved on 15 July 1998 by the Parliament of Wallonia, along with the region's coat of arms and flag.

Lyrics
Typically, only the first and third verses are performed.

See also 
 La Brabançonne
 De Vlaamse Leeuw

References

External links 
 Parliament of Wallonia – The Parliament of Wallonia has a page featuring the history and lyrics of the anthem, as well as instrumental versions.
 Union Culturelle Wallonne – The UCW has a page about the anthem that includes a vocal version from the CD, "Li Tchant des Walons", by the Orchestre de Choeurs de l'Opera Royal de Wallonie, with Patrick Delcour as baritone.

Chant des Wallons
Belgian anthems
French-language Belgian songs
Regional songs
1901 compositions
National anthem compositions in B-flat major